Lincoln P. Restler (born March 19, 1984) is an American politician and civil servant from New York City, who is a member of the New York City Council for the 33rd district which covers Greenpoint, parts of Vinegar Hill, Williamsburg, Boerum Hill, Brooklyn Heights, Dumbo, and other Downtown neighborhoods in northern Brooklyn. Restler co-founded reform political club, New Kings Democrats, and was a New York State Democratic District Leader. He held several positions in municipal government before running for City Council.

Early life and education
Restler grew up in Brooklyn Heights on Pierrepoint Street with an older sister. Restler is Jewish and attended the Reform Brooklyn Heights Synagogue in his youth.

He attended the Packer Collegiate Institute and graduated from Brown University in 2006. He was schoolmates with future political adversary and eventual Council predecessor, Stephen Levin.

Career
Restler became involved in politics while in undergrad with the Providence, Rhode Island City Council re-election campaign of David Segal, and in the 2008 presidential primary supporting Barack Obama.

He worked for the City of New York as an employee at the Department of Small Business Services and Department of Consumer Protection. Restler co-founded reform club New Kings Democrats in 2008, and worked in the Bill de Blasio administration. He worked on the de Blasio campaign and as senior policy advisor to the mayor.

In 2020, Restler resigned from the de Blasio administration and joined the St. Nicks Alliance.

Elected office
Restler was elected District Leader in the 50th Assembly District in 2010 when he was 26. His run was largely a rebuke of former Brooklyn Democratic Party boss Vito Lopez's attempt to shut reformers out and hold onto power while facing sexual harassment allegations. He was supported by U.S. Representative Nydia Velasquez and then-City Councilmember Tish James. Restler lost the seat in 2012 to Chris Olechowski, a community organizer backed by Lopez, by 19 votes.

In 2021, Restler defeated seven other candidates to win the Democratic nomination, and ran in the November general unopposed. He received endorsements from State Senators Julia Salazar and Jabari Brisport, the Working Families Party, Public Advocate Jumaane Williams, and Velasquez. In the 7th round of ranked choice voting, he prevailed over closest candidate Elizabeth Adams 63%-37%.

Election history

References

External links

21st-century American Jews
21st-century American politicians
Brown University alumni
Jewish American people in New York (state) politics
Living people
New York (state) Democrats
New York City Council members
People from Greenpoint, Brooklyn
Politicians from Brooklyn
1984 births